Praktores 005 enantion (C)Hrysopodarou or Praktores 005 ena(n)dion Hris(s)opodarou is a 1965 Greek comedy film written and directed by Orestis Laskos and starring Kostas Rigopoulos, Costas Hajihristos, Giannis Gkionakis, Beata Asimakopoulou, Giorgos Vrassivanopoulos and Giorgos Velentzas. The film was shot in black-and-white.

The film title means Agents 005 against Goldenfoot, in humorous reference to Goldfinger (1964).

Plot

The protagonists of the film are the brothers Damianos (Giannis Gkionakis) and Kosmas (Costas Hajihristos) Bouralas, fans of the James Bond film series and tavern owners. They are also shareholders of a manufacturing company, co-owning 5%. They use the codename Agents 005 to refer to themselves, after the number of the shares they own.

The company's chief executive officer is Mikes Pararas (Kostas Rigopoulos), who owns 47,5% of the shares. He and his right-hand man Telis Hatzineftis (Giorgos Vrasivanopoulos) shamelessly exploit the company's staff and embezzle its funds. The Bouralas brothers nickname Mikes "Goldenfoot".

The status quo of the company is shaken with the imminent arrival of Rita Pavlidi (Eleni Kriti), owner of the remaining 47,5% shares of the company. Rita is able to challenge the control of Mikes' in the company, since she owns an equal number of shares. In the upheaval, the Bouralas brothers take over the running of the company. With the assistance of Aleka (Beata Asimakopoulou) and Fofo (Dina Triadi), they uncover evidence of the previous administration's financial crimes.

Cast
Kostas Rigopoulos ..... Mikes Pararas
Costas Hajihristos ..... Kosmas Bouralas
Giannis Gkionakis ..... Damianos Bouralas
Beata Asimakopoulou ..... Aleka
Dina Triadi ..... Fofo
Eleni Kriti ..... Rita Pavlidi
Yorgos Vrassivanopoulos ..... Telis Hatzineftis
Panayiostis Karavoussianos ..... Karadaounis
Giorgos Velentzas ..... Giannis
Nassos Kedrakas ..... Papasotiriou
Giorgos Tzifos ..... customer

External links

1965 films
1960s Greek-language films
1965 comedy films
Films directed by Orestis Laskos
Greek black-and-white films
Films about businesspeople
Greek comedy films